The 1992 United States Senate election in Indiana was held on November 3, 1992. Incumbent Republican U.S. Senator Dan Coats won re-election to his first full term.

Background
When incumbent Republican U.S. Senator Dan Quayle resigned from the Senate after being elected Vice President of the United States in 1988, Coats was appointed to Quayle’s former seat. He then won re-election to serve the remainder of the term in 1990. Coats would then be elected to this seat 18 years later in 2010.

Major candidates

Democratic
 Joe Hogsett, Indiana Secretary of State

Republican
 Dan Coats, incumbent U.S. Senator

Results

Overall
Coats won the election easily. Hogsett did perform well in some counties in southern Indiana, and also managed to win a few counties in western Indiana. Hogsett’s strongest performance by far was in Lake County where he received over 60% of the vote.

By county
Coats won 79 of Indiana's counties compared to 13 for Hogsett.

See also
 1992 United States Senate elections

References

1992
Indiana
1992 Indiana elections